John James Hayes (born 2 November 1973) is a retired Irish rugby union player who played in the Pro12 and Heineken Cup for Munster. He didn't start playing rugby until he was 18; prior to this he played with the local Cappamore GAA hurling club. It was his size (6 ft 4 in, 19 stone) that enabled him to overcome his late start to the sport. He continues to "follow GAA in Limerick very much and especially hurling".

Early rugby
Hayes was introduced to the game of rugby union by friends when he joined local rugby club Bruff in County Limerick. He then moved up a grade when he joined Shannon before travelling to Invercargill, New Zealand, where he changed position from lock to prop because he had "bulked up". On his return to Ireland, he rejoined Shannon and gained a place on the Munster squad. He later rejoined his original club Bruff when they joined the AIL as a senior club in 2004. 

In September 2012, he released his autobiography The Bull: My Story, which details his sporting life. On 5 October 2012, he appeared as a guest on the Late Late Show alongside his wife to talk about his career.

Munster
In 2006, he helped Munster win the Heineken European Cup in Cardiff's Millennium Stadium on 21 May against Biarritz. Earlier that year, he had helped Ireland secure the Triple Crown.

In 2008, he again helped Munster win the Heineken European Cup in Cardiff's Millennium Stadium on 24 May against Toulouse.

He became the fifth Munster player to win 200 caps in the Magners League semi-final against Ospreys on 14 May 2011. In July 2011, Hayes was left out the 45-man Munster squad for the forthcoming season fuelling speculation that he may retire after the 2011 Rugby World Cup.

Despite the speculation that Hayes would retire, he came off the bench for Munster in their opening Pro12 match against Newport Gwent Dragons in September 2011. Hayes was contracted with Munster until the end of 2011.

Hayes became the first person to play 100 Heineken Cup games in November 2011 when he came on against Northampton Saints in the 2011–12 Heineken Cup.

It was announced that Hayes would retire after Munster's Pro12 fixture against Connacht on 26 December 2011. He was selected to start his final match, and was substituted in the 58th minute, going off the pitch to a huge standing ovation from the crowd. Munster won the match 24–9.

Ireland
Hayes won his first international cap against Scotland in 2000 and was Ireland's first-choice tighthead prop from then until the beginning of the 2010–11 season when he was replaced by Leinster's Mike Ross. He was a member of the British & Irish Lions squad in their tour to New Zealand in 2005 and played in the warm-up test match vs Argentina.

Hayes became Ireland's most capped player during Ireland's first Grand Slam in 61 years in 2009 with 94 appearances.

He earned his 100th cap for Ireland against England on 27 February 2010. He was the first Irish player to do so. Hayes led Ireland out onto the pitch before the game to a standing ovation from the Twickenham crowd. Ireland went on to win 20–16 with a late try by Tommy Bowe. Hayes did not play against the Barbarians in Ireland's first match of the summer tests and missed the test against New Zealand through illness. He came on as a replacement against New Zealand Maori but was left out of the squad to play Australia, thereby losing his title of Ireland's most capped player to Brian O'Driscoll.

Hayes was selected in Ireland's training squad for the 2011 Rugby World Cup warm-ups in August and came off the bench in Ireland's first warm-up against Scotland. This turned out to be his last appearance for Ireland as he was not selected in the final 30-man squad for the tournament in New Zealand. He retired in December 2011.

2009 Lions Tour
On 18 June 2009, Hayes was called up to the British & Irish Lions squad in South Africa as a replacement for the injured Euan Murray. He played in the final test of the tour.

Statistics

International analysis by opposition

Correct as of 5 July 2017
* indicates inclusion of caps for British & Irish Lions

Honours

Munster
 United Rugby Championship:
 Winner (3): 2002–03, 2008–09, 2010–11
 Celtic Cup:
 Winner (1): 2004–05
 European Rugby Champions Cup:
 Winner (2): 2005–06, 2007–08

Ireland
 Six Nations Championship:
 Winner (1): 2009
 Grand Slam:
 Winner (1): 2009
 Triple Crown:
 Winner (4): 2004, 2006, 2007, 2009

References

External links
Munster Profile
Ireland Profile
British & Irish Lions Profile
Pro14 Profile

1973 births
Living people
Rugby union players from County Limerick
Irish rugby union players
Shannon RFC players
Munster Rugby players
Ireland international rugby union players
British & Irish Lions rugby union players from Ireland
Rugby union props